Seyed Javad Sadatinejad (born 1972, Kashan) is an Iranian politician and representative of the tenth and eleventh terms of the Islamic Parliament of Iran and Minister of Agriculture in the government of Ebrahim Raisi.

References 

1972 births
Living people
Government ministers of Iran
Members of the 11th Islamic Consultative Assembly